The Wizzard (born Merlin St. Hilaire) is a popular calypso musician from Dominica.  He began performed in church as a young man, then competed in the carnival calypso tent in 1988, placing second.  In 1989, he won the competition with "Feed My Brother" and "Young an' Restless"; that year, he also placed second at the Independence Calypso competition.  He retained his Calypso King title in 1990, as well as placing second representing Dominica at the Caribbean Broadcasting Union Song Festival.

References
Virtual Dominica

20th-century Dominica male singers
Calypsonians
Living people
Year of birth missing (living people)